At It Again is a studio album by The Dubliners and was released on the Major Minor label in 1968. It featured "The Irish Navy", a satirical song with lyrics co-written by Ronnie Drew and Luke Kelly and set to music by John Sheahan.  Barney McKenna and Ciarán Bourke also feature on the album. It was re-released under the title Seven Deadly Sins. The order of the tracks varies in different re-releases.

Track listing

Side One
 "Seven Deadly Sins" (McLean) 
 "Net Hauling Song" (Ewan MacColl)
 "Nancy Whiskey" (Collected MacColl)
 "Many Young Men of Twenty" (Keane)
 "Instrumental medley: Paddy's Gone to France, Skylark" (Traditional)
 "Molly Bawn" (Traditional)
 "The Dundee Weaver" (Collected by Jeffrey)

Side Two
 "The Irish Navy" (Drew-Kelly)
 "Tibby Dunbar" (Robert Burns and Jim McLean)
 "The Inniskillen Dragoons" (Traditional)
 "Instrumental medley: The Piper's Chair, Bill Hart's Jig, The Knights (misspelled as Nights) of St. Patrick" (Traditional)
 "I Wish I Were Back in Liverpool" (Kelly-Rosselson)
 "'Darby O'Leary" 
 "Go to Sea No More" (Collected by Halliday)

The Dubliners albums
1968 albums
Major Minor Records albums
Seven deadly sins in popular culture